Marina Leonardi (born 1970) is an Italian pianist and composer. Leonardi was born in Catania, Italy and studied piano with Oria Dell’Angelo, and composition with Alexander Mullenbach, Giovanni Ferrauto, Alessandro Solbiati and Eliodoro Sollima. After completing her studies, Leonardi took a position as professor of composition at the Vincenzo Bellini Musical Institute in Catania. Her compositions have been performed internationally.

Works
Leonardi is known for prepared piano works. Selected compositions include:

Postludio for piano (2008)
Interludio for two pianos (2008)
Tre Pezzi for orchestra (2007)
Duo for piano and percussions (2007)
Rubaijat for soprano and flute (2006)
Itinera for ensemble (2006)
Giochi for violin and piano (2005)
Rubaijat for ensemble (1996)

References

External links
Marina Leonardi, Ludio for piano

1970 births
Living people
20th-century classical composers
Italian music educators
Women classical composers
Italian classical composers
Musicians from Catania
20th-century Italian composers
21st-century women musicians
Women music educators
20th-century women composers